Texas Trail is a 1937 American Western film directed by David Selman and starring William Boyd, Russell Hayden, and George "Gabby" Hayes.

Based on Clarence E. Mulford's 1922 novel, Tex, the film takes place during the Spanish–American War.

Plot
Hopalong Cassidy (William Boyd) is asked by Major McCready (Karl Hackett) to round up 500 horses for government soldiers. Meanwhile, a gang of outlaws plot to steal the horses.

Cast
 William Boyd as Hopalong Cassidy
 Russell Hayden as Lucky Jenkins
 George 'Gabby' Hayes as Windy Halliday
 Judith Allen as Barbara Allen
 Billy King as Boots McCready
 Alexander Cross as Black Jack Carson
 Karl Hackett as Major McCready
 Bob Kortman as Henchman Hawks
 Jack Rockwell as Henchman Shorty
 John Beach as Smokey
 Ray Bennett as Henchman Brad
 Philo McCullough as Jordan
 Ben Corbett as Fort Guard (uncredited) 
 Earle Hodgins as Commanding Officer (uncredited)

References

External links

 
 
 
 

1937 films
1937 Western (genre) films
American Western (genre) films
American black-and-white films
1930s English-language films
Hopalong Cassidy films
Films set in Texas
Films directed by David Selman
1930s American films